Edward Goddard (died 10 June 1679) was the member of the Parliament of England for Marlborough for the parliament of March 1679.

References 

Members of Parliament for Marlborough
English MPs 1679
1679 deaths
Year of birth unknown